Jose Daniel Gemy (born 11 September 1992) is a Bolivian chess International Master since 2012, and a FIDE Master since 2010. He is ranked second in Bolivia.

He won the Pan American Junior Chess Championship in 2012, and the Bolivian Chess Championship in 2012, 2013, 2015-2017, 2020 and 2022.

In the 3rd Marcel Duchamp Cup, he reached 6th to 15th place (out of 131 players) with a score of 6.5/9.

References

Living people
1992 births
Bolivian chess players

Chess International Masters